El sonriure amagat  is a 2010 film.

Synopsis
Daniel, a 10-year-old Ethiopian boy, roams the streets of Addis Ababa alone by night. He is one of the 170,000 children without family who live in the city. He has just escaped from his home in the countryside where he lived with his stepmother. His biological parents are dead: he never knew his father; his mother died in front of his eyes when she was run over by a car. During his nocturnal rambling, Daniel meets a group of street children who live in an old abandoned taxi. He asks them if he can sleep there.

Awards
 Medina del Campo 2010

External links

 

2010 films
Spanish short films
2010s Spanish films
Spanish drama films